The following highways are numbered 44A:

India
  National Highway 44A (India)

United States
 County Road 44A (Lake County, Florida)
 Massachusetts Route 44A (Fall River, Massachusetts)
 Nebraska Recreation Road 44A
 New York State Route 44A (former)
 County Route 44A (Cayuga County, New York)
 Oklahoma State Highway 44A
 Vermont Route 44A